The Prostitution Information Centre (PIC, Dutch: Prostitutie Informatie Centrum) is located in the heart of Amsterdam in the red light district, near Amsterdam's Old Church.    The PIC serves as an educational centre and resource for providing Amsterdam's visitors with information and advice about prostitution.

The practice of prostitution in the Netherlands was legalised nationally in October 2000.  However, Amsterdam has long had a tolerant attitude towards prostitution, coupled with clear regulations that have been in force for many decades.  Though prostitution is legal in Amsterdam, there is still a considerable amount of misunderstanding about it. The PIC's objective is to clear up some of that misunderstanding by providing visitors with accurate information regarding prostitution.

Founder: Mariska Majoor

The PIC was founded in August 1994 by former prostitute Mariska Majoor.  Majoor worked as prostitute from the age of 16 to 21, and quit, in her words, “because I feel different now about sex and relationships than a couple of years ago…but there are plenty of people, who like me, have made a well considered choice to work in prostitution, and they deserve our respect.”

She founded the PIC to inform the uneducated about prostitution.  The PIC's purpose is to offer a freely accessible place where people who have questions about prostitution can get answers to almost any prostitution-related question, or can be referred to other knowledgeable organizations if necessary.  Majoor strongly believes that prostitution is a profession that all countries should legalise.  She has said, “Every country should legalise prostitution; it’s part of society. In our eyes it’s a profession, a way of making money; it’s important that we are realistic about this. Most people think legalising is approval but it can be a way to deal with it, to organise it and make it safer. Prostitution is not bad; it’s only bad if done against one’s will. Most women make this decision themselves.”

Visitor information

Today the PIC is run by Majoor and other former prostitutes, and provides information to around 22,000 visitors a year.  Visitors to the PIC can also find books about the red light district and sex works written in both Dutch and English.  The PIC conducts lectures and slide presentations on prostitution and other sex-work related issues. Staff members of the PIC will also take interested visitors on a walking tour of the red light district.  Groups can book a one-hour tour at the PIC whose experts will walk visitors through the neighborhood, explaining in detail how things work.

Wallenwinkel (Red Light District Store) 

The PIC operates as a charitable foundation.  It receives no government subsidies and has only survived over the years with great difficulty.  However, the objectives of the PIC have been proven to be of importance to sex workers, their clients, Amsterdam residents, and visitors to the area alike.   Without any financial support the PIC was struggling to operate, but clearly the PIC played a valuable role and needed to find a way to survive.  So in January 2004, the PIC's activities merged with those of De Wallenwinkel, or the Red Light District Store.

The Wallenwinkel, located next to the PIC, now operates as the PIC shop and provides the main source of financial support for the Prostitution Information Centre.   The Wallenwinkel specialises in unique red light district souvenirs and other articles related to Amsterdam's famous district.  Many of the handmade gifts at the Wallenwinkel cannot be found anywhere else in the area and thus make great souvenirs for Amsterdam's travelers.

References

External links
Prostitution Information Center
Red Light District Store

1994 establishments in the Netherlands
Buildings and structures in Amsterdam
Culture in Amsterdam
Tourist attractions in Amsterdam
Prostitution in the Netherlands
20th-century architecture in the Netherlands